Ritopek  (Serbian Cyrillic: Ритопек) is a suburban settlement of Belgrade, Serbia. It is located in the municipality of Grocka, 20 km east of Belgrade and 19 km west of the municipal seat, on the right bank of the Danube, across from the village of Ivanovo in Banat region of the Vojvodina province.

History 

Pre-Roman artifacts from the Late Iron Age, have been discovered in Ritopek. The most representative is the Scythian styled pendant from the 5th century BC, a representation of a stylized griffin's head with tentacles. The remains belonging to the Scordisci, a Celtic  tribe which founded Singidunum, the predecessor of Belgrade, were also found in Ritopek.

In Roman times, the fortress of Tricornium (Latin for "three-horned fortification") existed at the site of Ritopek.  It contained an important military camp Castra Tricornia. The name originated from three distinctive hills dominating the landscape, one of which was later washed away into the Danube river. The settlement gave name to the Romanized Thracio-Celtic tribe of the Tricornenses. A ceremonial breast plate with stylistic illustrations belonging to Legio VII Claudia soldier Aurelius Herculanus and dating from 258 AD has been found, as have many other artifacts of the Roman period such as silver coins that were washed ashore once the dam of the Iron Gate I Hydroelectric Power Station was constructed.

Tricornium was one of the forts built to protect the Via Militaris road. Other known forts include Mutatio ad Sextum Militare, in Grocka, and Mutatio ad Sextum, in Mali Mokri Lug. Well preserved bust of the Roman emperor Macrinus (ruled 217-218) was found in the nearby Boleč.

The elementary school in Ritopek was one of the first schools in Serbia, established in 1838. Together with the school, the villagers built the first church which was completed in 1868 and is dedicated to the Holy Trinity.

Ritopek is frequently damaged by flooding of the Danube (such as in the floods in April 2006 and those of May 2014).

In 2020, beavers were spotted in Ritopek. Number of beavers began to decline in the second half of the 19th century, almost disappearing by the 1870s. Last specimens in the area were spotted in 1900 in Pančevo and in 1902 in Belgrade. Since then, they spread all through the northern and western Serbia, including the Belgrade surroundings (Ritopek, Obrenovac, Krnjača).

Economy 

Ritopek's economy is almost entirely based on agriculture, especially intensive fruit growing. Vast orchards surround the village. The villagers live off growing cherries, apricots, and apples, and vineyards were farmed in the past. A summer festival, Dani trešnje (Days of [the] cherry) is held in the village. As the village is stretched almost 5 km along the road, new section on the road of Smederevski put is modern, commercially oriented (gas stations, restaurants, workshops, parking lots, etc.), and connects the built-up area of Ritopek with Boleč and Vinča, thus making Ritopek the easternmost part of the continuous built-up area of Belgrade.

Population 

Ritopek is statistically classified as a rural settlement (village). Historical population of Ritopek according to the official censuses:

 1921 - 1,540
 1948 - 1,892
 1953 - 1,980
 1961 - 1,956
 1971 - 1,886
 1981 - 2,002
 1991 - 2,163 (de jure)
 1991 - 2,045 (de facto)
 2002 - 2,349 (de jure)
 2002 - 2,284 (de facto)
 2011 - 2,613

Notable people 
 Branislav Lečić, Serbian actor, director and politician.
 , Serbian actress.
 Branko Milićević, Serbian actor.

References

External links 

Suburbs of Belgrade
Šumadija